Postal orders of Zimbabwe have been issued since 18 April 1980.

Remainder issue of the postal orders of Rhodesia

These began to be issued on 18 April 1980, when the British colony of Rhodesia became independent as the Republic of Zimbabwe. Examples of these postal orders have been confirmed as having been issued in 1982, but it is not yet known when these were exhausted.

See also

Postal Orders of Rhodesia

Currencies of Zimbabwe
Zimbabwe
Postal system of Zimbabwe